Amphitecna macrophylla, commonly known as black calabash or chaff-bush, is a species of plant in the family Bignoniaceae. It is found in small patches of Mexico and Guatemala. It is drought tolerant and is hardy to USDA Hardiness Zone 10b.

References

macrophylla
Plants described in 1854
Taxa named by Berthold Carl Seemann
Taxa named by John Miers (botanist)
Taxa named by Henri Ernest Baillon
Cloud forest flora of Mexico
Flora of Guatemala